Yapıcı  (Turkish: "maker, builder") is a surname. Notable people with the surname include:

 Ebru Yapıcı (born 1976), Turkish photographer, actress, screenwriter and art director
 Nilay Yapici (born 1981), Turkish neuroscientist
 Serhat Yapıcı (born 1988), Turkish-German footballer

Turkish-language surnames